Boris Dron (born 17 March 1988) is a Belgian former professional racing cyclist, who rode professionally between 2010 and 2017.

Major results

2011
 8th Kattekoers
2012
 3rd De Vlaamse Pijl
 6th Overall Ronde de l'Oise
 8th Dwars door het Hageland
 9th Ronde Pévéloise
2013
 2nd Grote Prijs Stad Zottegem
 2nd Gooikse Pijl
 5th Kattekoers
 5th Antwerpse Havenpijl
2014
 3rd Kattekoers
 3rd Flèche Ardennaise
 6th Overall Tour du Gévaudan Languedoc-Roussillon

References

External links

1988 births
Living people
Belgian male cyclists
People from Virton
Cyclists from Luxembourg (Belgium)